Nadezhda Nikolayevna Kosheverova (23 September 1902  22 February 1989) was a Soviet film director and screenwriter who specialized in children's films.

Life
Kosheverova was born in Saint Petersburg to Nikolai Kosheverov, a merchant with a house on Sergievskaya Street. As a girl she was fond of dolls and puppets, which she explained as her inspiration for entering the world of cinema: "The cinema is like a puppet theater, because a lot of people work on creating the film, and the viewer sees only what they are supposed to see."

In 1923 she graduated from the acting school of the Bolshaya Komediya Theater and until 1928 worked as an actress in the theaters of Leningrad, including at Leningrad Comedy Theatre under Nikolay Akimov.

Beginning in 1929 she worked at Lenfilm, first as an assistant director on The Youth of Maxim (1934), The Return of Maxim (1937), and The Vyborg Side (1939).

Her first effort as a director was Once in Autumn (1937), which has since been lost. Her first success was the musical comedy Arinka (1939), directed in collaboration with Yuri Muzykant.

Before the outbreak of World War II she directed Galya, a film whose subject matter (related to the Winter War) led to its being banned from release.

In 1944 Kosheverova turned to the fairy tale genre, which would remain her main focus for the rest of her career.

In 1947 she experienced considerable success with Cinderella, another collaboration with Shapiro. The film was praised for its performances and script by Evgeny Schwartz. Kosheverova would go on to create other hit comedies (Shofyor Ponyevolye (1958) and Be Careful, Grandma! (1960). Several of her films starred Oleg Dal.

In 1963 Kosheverova and Mikhail Shapiro collaborated on Cain XVIII, a fairy tale film with political undertones, and a script by Nikolai Erdman. The script was carefully revised to avoid giving offense to the censors, but a scene of cross-dressing infuriated Nikita Khrushchev, who ordered the film banned as "homosexual propaganda". It was not shown again until the 1990s.

Kosheverova's last directorial work was the 1987 film The Tale of the Painter in Love.

She died in Moscow on 22 February 1989, and is buried in the village of Komarovo near Saint Petersburg.

Family
Her first husband was film director Nikolay Akimov, with whom she collaborated on the films Cinderella and Shadows. Her second husband was the director of photography Andrei Moskvin, her collaborator on the Maxim films and The Vyborg Side. Her second marriage produced a son, Nikolai.

Filmography

As director
 1939: Arinka
 1940: Galya
 1944: Cherevichki (with Mikhail Shapiro)
 1947: Cinderella (with Mikhail Shapiro)
 1953: Spring in Moscow (with Iosif Kheifits)
 1954: Tamer of Tigers (with Aleksandr Ivanovsky)
 1956: Honeymoon
 1958: Shofyor Ponyedolye
 1960: Be Careful, Grandma!
 1963: Cain XVIII (with Mikhail Shapiro)
 1966: New Attraction Today 
 1968: An Old, Old Tale
 1971: Shadow
 1974: Tsarevich Prosha
 1977: How Ivanushka the Fool Travelled in Search of Wonder
 1979: The Nightingale
 1982: The Donkey's Hide
 1984: And Then Came Bumbo...
 1987: The Tale about the Painter in Love

As screenwriter
 1944: Cherevichki (with Mikhail Shapiro)
 1953: Spring in Moscow

References

External links

1902 births
1989 deaths
20th-century Russian screenwriters
Mass media people from Saint Petersburg
Recipients of the Order of the Red Banner of Labour
Russian screenwriters
Russian women film directors
Soviet screenwriters
Soviet women film directors